Sukli is a river flowing through Chittorgarh district, Rajasthan, India. Karmai and Sukli are the major tributaries of the Jakham River. Sukli Dam was built on this river.

References

Rivers of Rajasthan
Rivers of India